Violin Concerto No. 2 in D major, K. 211 was composed by Wolfgang Amadeus Mozart in 1775. The concerto has the usual fast–slow–fast structure. The movements of the work have the tempo headings:

The concerto lasts around 20 minutes.

External links 

2
1775 compositions
Compositions in D major